Beautiful! is an album by Charles McPherson which was recorded in 1975 and released on the Xanadu label.

Reception

The Allmusic review recommended the album awarding it 4 stars and stating "Xanadu was a perfect label for altoist Charles McPherson since he was always a bop-based improviser who was perfectly at home jamming straightahead standards".

Track listing 
 "They Say It's Wonderful" (Irving Berlin) - 4:59   
 "But Beautiful" (Johnny Burke, Jimmy Van Heusen) - 6:18    
 "It Could Happen to You" (Burke, Van Heusen) - 5:43    
 "Lover"  (Lorenz Hart, Richard Rodgers) - 4:49   
 "This Can't Be Love" (Hart, Rodgers) - 5:28    
 "Body and Soul" (Frank Eyton, Johnny Green, Edward Heyman, Robert Sour) - 7:44    
 "It Had to Be You" (Isham Jones, Gus Kahn) - 5:42    
 "All God's Chillun Got Rhythm" (Walter Jurmann, Gus Kahn, Bronisław Kaper) - 8:59 Bonus track on CD reissue

Personnel 
Charles McPherson - alto saxophone
Duke Jordan - piano
Sam Jones - bass
Leroy Williams - drums

References 

Charles McPherson (musician) albums
1975 albums
Xanadu Records albums
Albums produced by Don Schlitten